For other people of the same name, please see Keith Hughes.

Keith Wills Hughes (born September 12, 1963) is a former Major League Baseball player who played for five teams in his major league career which lasted for parts of four seasons. He made his debut on May 19, 1987 with the New York Yankees. Then the Yankees traded him and Shane Turner to the Philadelphia Phillies for Mike Easler where he finished his rookie season. The following season he was traded with Rick Schu and Jeff Stone to the Baltimore Orioles for Frank Bellino and Mike Young. He played in 41 games with the Orioles that year, and didn't play in the majors in 1989.  In December of that year he was traded again. This time the Orioles traded him with Cesar Mejia to the New York Mets for John Mitchell and Joaquin Contreras. He played in 8 games with the Mets in 1990 and he did not come back to the majors until 1993 when the Cincinnati Reds brought him up for 3 games.

In the Puerto Rico Winter League in the '87-'88 season he hit a Grand Slam after Mayagüez Indios were down by 3 in the bottom of the 10th to give the championship to Mayagüez.

Early career
Keith attended Conestoga High School in Berwyn PA. He was signed as an undrafted free agent by the Philadelphia Phillies in 1981.

External links

1963 births
Living people
Cincinnati Reds players
Kansas City Royals scouts
New York Mets players
New York Yankees players
Baltimore Orioles players
Philadelphia Phillies players
Major League Baseball outfielders
Major League Baseball designated hitters
Nashville Sounds players
Baseball players from Pennsylvania
People from Bryn Mawr, Pennsylvania
Albany-Colonie Yankees players
Bend Phillies players
Columbus Clippers players
Indianapolis Indians players
American expatriate baseball players in Mexico
Industriales de Monterrey players
Maine Guides players
Omaha Royals players
Portland Beavers players
Reading Phillies players
Rochester Red Wings players
Spartanburg Spinners players
Tidewater Tides players